HMS Elephant was a 74-gun third-rate ship of the line of the Royal Navy. She was built by George Parsons in Bursledon, Hampshire, and launched on 24 August 1786.

In late November 1790 the ship narrowly avoided destruction when lightning struck her whilst she was in Portsmouth harbour. The main topmast exploded but did not plunge through the quarterdeck as it was still held by the toprope.

In 1801 Vice Admiral Horatio Nelson chose Elephant as his flagship during the Battle of Copenhagen due to its suitability for the shallow waters there. It was on this ship that he is said to have put his telescope to his blind eye and claimed not to be able to see a signal ordering him to withdraw. She lost 9 killed and 13 wounded then.

The Royal Navy took both into service. The ship participated in the Blockade of Saint-Domingue in the same year. The British patrolled off Cap-François. On 24 July the squadron, made up of Bellerophon, Elephant, and HMS Vanguard, came across two French 74-gun ships, Duquesne and Duguay-Trouin, and the frigate Guerrière, attempting to escape from Cap-François. The squadron gave chase, and on 25 July overhauled and captured Duquesne after a few shots were fired, while Duguay-Trouin and Guerrière managed to evade their pursuers and escape to France. One man was killed aboard Bellerophon during the pursuit. Elephant remained blockading Cap-François until November, when the French commander of the garrison there, General Rochambeau, was forced to surrender.

To prevent Rochambeau escaping, launches from Bellerophon and Elephant went into the Caracol Passage where they cut out the French schooner  on 22–23 November. The French formally surrendered on 30 November.

HMS Elephant, under the command of Francis Austen, captured the United States privateer Swordfish in December 1812 during the War of 1812.

Fate
Elephant was reduced to a 58-gun fourth rate in 1818, and broken up in 1830.

Footnotes

References

 
 
 
 Lavery, Brian (2003) The Ship of the Line - Volume 1: The development of the battlefleet 1650-1850. Conway Maritime Press. .

External links
 

Ships of the line of the Royal Navy
Arrogant-class ships of the line
1786 ships
Ships built on the River Hamble
War of 1812 ships of the United Kingdom